Vængir Júpiters is an Icelandic multi-sports club from the capital city, Reykjavík in the area of Grafarvogur.

Basketball
The club won the 2. deild karla in 2013, achieving promotion to the 1. deild karla. They finished in 9th place in the 1. deild during the 2013-2014 season.

Titles
2. deild karla
2013

Football
The club men's football team plays in 3. deild karla. They participated in the ignaural season of the 4. deild karla in 2014 and won the league in 2015.

Titles
4. deild karla
2015

Futsal
After winning the national championship in 2018, Júpiter's futsal team participated in the preliminary rounds of the 2018–19 UEFA Futsal Champions League. The club repeated as champions in 2019.

Titles
Icelandic champions
2018, 2019

Handball
Vængir Júpiters men's handball team participated in the 1. deild karla during the 2020-2021 season.

References

External links
Team profile at Football Association of Iceland

Basketball teams in Iceland
Football clubs in Iceland